Section header may refer to:
 Section (typography), the beginning of a new section in a document
 Radical (Chinese characters)
 Executable and Linkable Format#Section Header

See also:
 ISO 10303-21#HEADER section
 Value change dump#Header section
 List of HTTP header fields